When It's Polka Time at Your House is an album by Jimmy Sturr and His Orchestra, released through Vanguard Records in 1991. In 1991, the album won Sturr the Grammy Award for Best Polka Recording.

Track listing
 "Sleep All Day" (Jimmy Sturr, Will) – 2:07
 "Tuba Polka" (Glowacki) – 2:43
 "Break Out the Bottle" (Sturr, Will) – 1:36
 "Box Fiddle Polka" – 1:54
 "Carpenter Polka" (Wojnarowski) – 2:49
 "Pulaski Highway Polka" – 2:46
 "Jackpot Polka" (Wisniewski) – 2:32
 "That Polka Melody" (Tady) – 2:26
 "Just for You Waltz" (Nowack) – 3:30
 "Sturr-It-Up Polka" (Urbanovitch) – 2:00
 "Jolly Onion Polka" (Karnish) – 2:04
 "Polka Time at Your House" (Sturr) – 1:52
 "Fireball Mail" (Rose) – 1:52

Personnel

 Gene Bartkiewicz – Accordion
 Louise Bialik – Accordion
 Tony Cicero – Drums
 Dennis Coyman – Drums
 Wally Czerniawski – Accordion
 Bob Fitzer – Bass
 Jeff Hoffman – Piano
 Gary Jacobelly – Artwork, Vocals
 Ethan James – Engineer
 The Jordanaires – Vocals
 Johnny Karas – Arranger, Performer, Sax (Tenor), Vocals
 Joe Magnuszewski – Clarinet, Sax (Alto)

 Ken Morey – Arranger
 Al Noble – Trumpet
 Eric Parks – Trumpet
 Tom Pick – Engineer, Mixing, Producer
 Dennis Polisky – Clarinet, Sax (Alto)
 Paul Roessler – Piano
 Jimmy Sturr – Arranger, Clarinet, Mixing, Performer, Producer, Sax (Alto)
 Jimmy Sturr and His Orchestra – Performer
 Frank Urbanovitch – Bass, Fiddle, Vocals
 Ken Uy – Piano, Synthesizer
 Henry Will – Arranger
 Joe Zarawski – Bass

See also
 Polka in the United States

References

1991 albums
Jimmy Sturr albums
Vanguard Records albums
Grammy Award for Best Polka Album